In Canada's parliamentary system of responsible government, minority governments occur when no party has a majority of seats in the legislature. Typically, but not necessarily, the party with a plurality of seats forms the government. In a minority situation, governments must rely on the support of other parties to stay in power, so are less stable than a majority government. 

In Canada, most of the time political parties stand on their own, live or die, and rarely form official coalition governments to form a majority. But it has happened, such as Manitoba in 1941 as discussed below.

Canada's plurality voting system means that minority governments are relatively rare in comparison with countries that have a proportional representation voting system. However, minority governments have become more common at the federal level. As of 2022, five of the last seven governments have been minority governments at the federal level. Nine of Canada's 10 provinces, all but Alberta, have experienced minority governments as well, mostly produced by first-past-the-post elections.

Federal level

Canada has had 15 minority governments, experiencing its longest period of minority government with three successive minority governments elected in 2004, 2006 and 2008.

 Alexander Mackenzie (1873–1874, Liberal)	
 William Lyon Mackenzie King (1921–1925, 1925–1926, 1926–1930, Liberal)
 Arthur Meighen (1926, Conservative)
 John Diefenbaker (1957–1958, 1962–1963, Progressive Conservative)
 Lester Pearson (1963–1965, 1965–1968, Liberal)
 Pierre Trudeau (1972–1974, Liberal)
 Joe Clark (1979–1980, Progressive Conservative)
 Paul Martin (2004–2006, Liberal)
 Stephen Harper (2006–2008, 2008–2011, Conservative)
 Justin Trudeau (2019–2021, 2021–current, Liberal)

Provincial and territorial level
Of Canada's 10 provinces, only Alberta has never had a minority government. The territories of Northwest Territories and Nunavut do not have political parties and are instead governed under the consensus government system.

In cases where one party does not have a majority of the seats, a coalition government may be formed through a legislative merger of two or more parties. Such was the case in Manitoba in 1941 when a wartime coalition made up of Conservatives, CCF and Social Credit was formed and (mostly) did not run candidates against each other in the election that year, winning majority government as a coalition and governing as a coalition thereafter.
 
 New Brunswick (1920–1925, 2018–2020)
 Newfoundland and Labrador (1971–1972, 2019–2021)
 Nova Scotia (1970–1974, 1998–1999, 2003–2006, 2006–2009)
 Prince Edward Island (1873–1876, 1876–1879, 1890–1893, 2019–2020) 
 Quebec (1878–1879, 2007–2008, 2012–2014) 
 Ontario (1867–1871, 1943–1945, 1975–1977, 1977–1981, 1985–1987, 2011–2014)
 Manitoba (1920–1922, 1936–1941, 1958–1959, 1969–1973, 1988–1990)
 Saskatchewan (1929–1934, 1999–2003) 
 British Columbia (1924–1928, 1952–1953, 2017–2020)
 Yukon (1985–1989, 1992–1996, since 2021)

References
 Minority Governments in Canada, by Stephen Azzi, D. Kwavnick

Politics of Canada
Canada